The Arban Method, titled with some variation over the years as Arban's World Renowned Method for the Cornet and Arban's Complete Celebrated Method for the Cornet, is a complete pedagogical method for students of trumpet, cornet, and other brass instruments. The original edition was published by Jean-Baptiste Arban sometime before 1859 and has been reissued by multiple publishers, with notable revisions made by T.H. Rollinson published in 1879 by J.W. Pepper, Edwin Franko Goldman published in 1893 by Carl Fischer, and Claude Gordon published in 1982 also by Carl Fischer. It contains hundreds of exercises ranging from basic to advanced compositions, with later editions also including a selection of popular themes as solos and duets by various composers, and several original compositions by Arban including his famous arrangement of Carnival of Venice.

Structure

Introduction
In the Introduction J. B. Arban covers the range of the cornet (trumpet). He also details alternate fingerings and describes the use of the tuning slide. Arban states his opinion that the mouthpiece should be two-thirds on the lower lip and one-third on the upper. Arban then stresses the proper "attack" technique. He uses the "tu" pronunciation, which in French is said with the tongue in the "tee" position. Arban concludes with proper breathing technique (see diaphragmatic breathing).

I. First Studies
Arban then begins his method with a focus on tone (Studies 1-10). The next studies (11-50) familiarize the student with fingerings, develop their range, and instill a habit of precision in attacking the notes. In the next section, which is devoted to syncopation, goes from a simple quarter-half-quarter rhythm to a sixteenth-eighth-sixteenth repeated rhythm. Next, Arban focuses on the dotted eighth-sixteenth and eighth-double sixteenth rhythms. He ends the First Studies with 10 studies on the  meter.

II. Playing Methods: Slurring or Legato Playing
Professor Arban devotes the next section of his vast method to slurring or legato playing. He begins with simple slurs that are accomplished by the variation of valves. He suggests pronouncing "taw-ee" while playing. The editor recommends adding little more air on the top note. (Such a technique is also needed to accomplish trills.) Arban devotes half of this whole section, though, to lip slurs. He concludes this section with a series of advanced studies combining slurred and staccato playing.

III. Scales

Arban's series on scales includes studies of major, minor, and chromatic scales, as well as numerous variations thereof. Arban admits to giving minor scales "limited treatment," but Gordon refutes this by citing the nonexistence of "limits on the use of the Trumpet and Cornet."

IV. Ornaments

Next, Arban teaches the student the various ornaments that can be played on a trumpet or cornet. He details the simple appoggiatura, grace note (short appoggiatura), portamento, double appoggiatura, the turn, the trill, and the mordent. Arban concludes the fourth section by combining the various ornaments and integrating them into various tunes.

V. More Advanced Studies
The "more advanced studies" include studies on intervals; broken octaves and tenths; triplets; the four-sixteenth rhythmic figure; major and minor arpeggios; the dominant seventh arpeggio; and cadenzas.

VI. Tonguing
Next, Arban focuses on triple tonguing, double tonguing, and fanfare tonguing. Arban uses various "tu-ku" pronunciation combinations, and Gordon subsequently replaces these with "tee-kee" combinations. In his studies on double tonguing, Arban includes a score of studies in which he combines double tonguing with slurs occurring on various beats and within them.

The Art of Phrasing: 150 Classic and Popular Melodies
The Art of Phrasing was written by Arban in 1866, but was never added to the original French edition of the Method. These songs and duets first appeared in the American Edition of the Arban Method published by the Jean White Company in 1872. This new version added 28 duets entitled 28 Recreations, 32 Melodies, and 100 Art of the Phrasing songs. J.W. Pepper and Carl Fischer also added the Art of Phrasing to their Arban Methods in the late 1800s.

68 Duets for Two Cornets
As in his other sections, Arban progresses from simple pieces to more challenging ones.

14 Characteristic Studies
Before his final 12 fantasias, Arban provides 14 challenging characteristic studies. His concluding remarks preceding these are as follows: Those of my readers who…want to attain…perfection, should…try to hear good music well interpreted. They must seek out…the most illustrious models, and…purify their taste, verify their sentiments, and bring themselves as near as possible to that which is beautiful.
These passages are challenging and are longer than all of the previous sections' pieces. Each is a full page long (in the platinum edition), and they crescendo in difficulty as they progress; the fourteenth study is two pages long and the only piece in this section in  time.

12 Celebrated Fantasies and Airs Varies
In addition to the eleven fantasias (fantasies) for B-flat cornets, there is one for the A cornet ("Fantasie and Variations on Acteon"). Arban's celebrated composition "Fantasie and Variations on The Carnival of Venice" is the eleventh fantasia in the list.

Criticism

Dated Commentary
The original text by Arban reflects the misconceptions and opinions common among musicians at the time of publication. Manufacturing limitations on period cornets shaped Arban's opinions of the instrument's limitations in regards to rhythmic complexity, range, intonation, and tuning with the use of crooks. Explanations of sound production rely on tension in the lips and do not reflect the modern understanding of turbulent flow within brass instruments. Annotated versions of the text will contradict Arban's opinions based on modern instrument capabilities and knowledge.

Deficient Coverage
The First Studies suggest a development of high end of range and endurance beyond the capabilities of most novice players. A warm-up routine is not outlined. The extreme high register is not explored, nor are techniques for more modern music genres included, such as improvisation for jazz. Scale exercises over the minor keys are few in number and only cover diatonic and chromatic scales.

Notes

External links

Sound samples of some solos and exercises

Music education